was a Japanese academic, an historian and author.  He was for many years a professor at the University of Tokyo.

Early life
Seiichi was born in Tokyo.  He attended the University of Tokyo, graduating in 1925.

Career
Seiichi was a member of the faculty of the University of Tokyo.  His contribution to Japanese historiography is measured in the effect his teaching and example produced in a younger generation of students.

Indonesian history
Iwao was considered a leading scholar in the colonial period of Indonesian history. The research used documents of the Dutch East Indies Company in the archives of the Hague and Jakarta.

Japanese history
Iwao's research and writing covered a broad range, including his early work on Japanese emigrant communities in South Asia and his later work on the Edo period of national seclusion (sakoku).

Selected works
In a statistical overview derived from writings by and about Seiichi Iwao, OCLC/WorldCat encompasses roughly 100+ works in 200+ publications in 7 languages and 1,500+ library holdings.

 1940 –  Nan'yo Nihonmachi no kenkyu (1940)
 1943 – Early Japanese settlers in the Philippines (1943)
 朱印船貿易史の研究 (1958)
 朱印船と日本町 (1962)
 鎖国 (1966)
 近世の洋学と海外交涉 (1979)
 荷蘭時代台灣史論文集 (2001)
 1982 – Biographical Dictionary of Japanese History (1982), with Burton Watson 
 2002 –  Dictionnaire historique du Japon, Vol. I;  Vol. II(2002), with Teizō Iyanaga, Susumu Ishii, Shōichirō Yoshida et al.

Affiliations
 Japan Academy, elected 1965.
 Franco-Japanese Historical Society (Societe Franco-Japonaise des Sciences Historiques; Nichi-Futsu Rekishi Gakkai)
 Japan-Netherlands Institute (Nichi-Ran Gakkai)

Honors
 Imperial Academy, Imperial Academy Prize, 1941
 Order of the Sacred Treasure, 1970.

Notes

References
 Hall, John Whitney.   "Review: Biographical Dictionary of Japanese History by Seiichi Iwao; Burton Watson," Monumenta Nipponica, Vol. 33, No. 4 (Winter, 1978), pp. 473–476.
 National Committee of Japanese Historians. (1991).  Historical studies in Japan (VII) 1983-1987 (Nihon ni okeru rekishigaku no hattatsu to genjō). Leiden: Brill Publishers. ; ; 
 Soedjatmoko. (2007).  An Introduction to Indonesian Historiography. Jakarta: Equinox. ; 

 Some of this article's contents are derived from the Seiichi Iwao article on the Japanese Wikipedia.

Academic staff of the University of Tokyo
20th-century Japanese historians
Recipients of the Order of the Sacred Treasure
1900 births
1988 deaths
University of Tokyo alumni
Members of the Japan Academy